The Australian Football League has numerous grounds upon which senior VFL/AFL games have been played. This list comprises current grounds in use, former grounds in use (both major and minor), regional pre-season grounds and international grounds.

Most Australian rules football grounds are also used for cricket, which is also played on a grassed, oval-shaped ground, and it is commonplace for a ground to be used for football in winter and cricket in summer.

Due to the popularity of Australian rules football, particularly in southern Australia, most of Australia's largest stadiums by capacity are used for Australian rules football; and it is therefore common to use those stadiums for other high-drawing events, particularly sporting events. Sports such as rugby and soccer can be readily played on an Australian rules football arena, as their rectangular fields are small enough to be set on the larger oval.

The oldest Australian Football League ground is the Melbourne Cricket Ground. The ground was built in 1854 and is still used for hosting AFL matches, including each year's Grand Final. The ground also has the largest capacity, at 100,024. The ground to be used most recently for its first Australian Football League matches is Riverway Stadium in Townsville, Queensland, during the 2019 season.

As of the end of 2020, a total of 47 different venues have hosted VFL/AFL premiership matches since the league was established in 1897.

AFL/VFL premiership season venues

Current grounds
The following table shows a list of all of grounds that are currently used in the Australian Football League, as of the 2020 AFL season. The table includes grounds where teams have commercial deals in place to transfer home games to these grounds each season but are not full-time tenants of those grounds; in these cases, the club is shown in italics in the current tenants column. Due to the effects of the COVID-19 pandemic, not all of these stadiums were actively used during 2020 itself, but they remain current venues used by the league.

Former major grounds

The following table comprises a list of former grounds that were at one stage the primary home ground for a club to play its VFL/AFL matches on.

Most of the grounds were the original home of current teams (for example, Arden Street Oval was North Melbourne's home ground) and have ceased hosting VFL/AFL matches, usually due to location and lack of capacity. Princes Park was the last of the suburban venues to see an AFL game, with the last match occurring in 2005. These grounds now usually serve as a boutique training oval and administrative base for these AFL clubs, and some are used for TAC Cup, VFL or suburban league matches.

Waverley Park (originally known as VFL Park), located in Mulgrave, Victoria was the first purpose-built stadium for VFL/AFL matches, opening in 1970. Original plans called for the grounds capacity to be 155,000, which would have made it one of the largest stadiums in the world. The venue, with its planned higher capacity, was originally to be a replacement for the Melbourne Cricket Ground as host of the VFL's Grand Final. However, in 1982/1983, when the extensions to finish the original plans were due to commence, the Government of Victoria refused to approve the plans for the stadium because the upgrade would have threatened the Melbourne Cricket Ground's right to host the Grand Final. Hence, no further development ever occurred and the capacity was set at 78,000. It was used until 1999, and was replaced by the Docklands Stadium.

Football Park, which was located in West Lakes, Adelaide, had a similar history to Waverley Park; it was purpose built for South Australian National Football League (SANFL) games and opened in 1974, replacing Adelaide Oval as the primary venue for the league. Unlike Waverley Park, it did become the venue for SANFL Grand Finals. It was the primary South Australian venue for VFL/AFL matches from 1991, when the league expanded into Adelaide, until 2013, and it was replaced by the newly refurbished Adelaide Oval.

Former minor grounds

Minor grounds have been used in the VFL/AFL, but only sparingly. There have been two main reasons historically for this:
To spread the game to other parts of the country. A prominent example of this is round 8, 1952, when all games for that round were played at minor grounds throughout Australia.
Due to unavailability of primary home grounds. In particular, minor grounds were also used throughout World War II, as some of the larger grounds throughout Victoria were being occupied by servicemen.

Pre-season venues 

The following list, is a list of the venues that have been used in AFL pre-season competition.

Many of the grounds were used in the Regional Challenge stage of the AFL pre-season competition, NAB Cup, which was used to bring AFL games to regional centres of South Australia, New South Wales, Queensland, Northern Territory, Western Australia and Victoria.

International exhibition/pre-season venues 

The following is a list of all of the international venues where a game of Australian rules football featuring VFL/AFL clubs has been played (in order of year last used). International matches have included pre-season competition matches or postseason exhibition matches. As of the end of 2018, the only international venues to host matches for premiership points are Westpac Stadium, in Wellington, New Zealand; and Adelaide Arena at Jiangwan Stadium, Shanghai, China.

The first international Australian rules football exhibition match was in London in 1916. A team of Australian soldiers stationed in England at the time formed a team to play against a "training group". The game brought a crowd of 3,000 people that even included the Prince of Wales (later King Edward VIII) and King Manuel II of Portugal.

The more recent AFL international matches have been part of the pre-season competition format and been highly successful. Countries that have hosted such matches include: United Arab Emirates, South Africa and the United Kingdom. There are also plans to expand the game further into countries such as India and Japan.

AFL Women's venues
Below are the venues that have been used since the commencement of the AFL Women's competition in 2017.

See also

List of Australian cricket grounds
List of ice rinks in Australia
List of indoor arenas in Australia
List of National Basketball League (Australia) venues
List of Australian rugby league stadiums
List of Australian rugby union stadiums
List of soccer stadiums in Australia
List of Oceanian stadiums by capacity

References

External links
List of AFL/VFL premiership season venues with game statistics

Grounds
Australian Football League
Australian Football League grounds